The 1984–85 Israel State Cup (Gvia HaMedina) was the 46th season of Israel's nationwide football cup competition and the 31st after the Israeli Declaration of Independence.

The competition was won by Beitar Jerusalem who have beaten Maccabi Haifa 1–0 in the final.

Results

Sixth Round

Seventh Round

Round of 16

Quarter-finals

Semi-finals

Final

References
100 Years of Football 1906-2006, Elisha Shohat (Israel), 2006, pp. 265
Football 1985/86 (Pages 130-131), Israel Football Association, 1985 

Israel State Cup
State Cup
Israel State Cup seasons